Rudolph Donnavon "Rudy" Burgess (born September 19, 1984) is a former gridiron football wide receiver. He was signed by the Indianapolis Colts as an undrafted free agent in 2008. He played college football at Arizona State.

Burgess was also a member of the New York Jets and Chicago Bears.

 He took off in college, he became just the 14th player in NCAA history to record over 1,000 rushing, receiving and returns yards.

External links
Arizona State Sun Devils bio
Chicago Bears bio
Indianapolis Colts bio

1984 births
Living people
American football cornerbacks
American football wide receivers
Arizona State Sun Devils football players
Chicago Bears players
Edmonton Elks players
Indianapolis Colts players
New York Jets players
Sportspeople from Brooklyn
Players of American football from New York City
Arizona Rattlers players